Burke Musgrove (March 31, 1941 – April 13, 1993) was an American politician who served in the Texas House of Representatives from 1967 to 1971.

He died in a car accident on April 13, 1993, in Comanche, Texas at age 52.

References

External links

|-

1941 births
1993 deaths
Democratic Party members of the Texas House of Representatives
20th-century American politicians